Şahinkaya is a quarter of the city of Elazığ, Elazığ Province in Turkey. Its population is 2,057 (2021). It became a quarter of Elazığ in 2020. The village is populated by Kurds.

References

Elazığ
Kurdish settlements in Elazığ Province